Brit Volden (born 4 April 1960) is a Norwegian orienteering competitor. She won the 1987 Relay World Championship, as well as a silver medal in 1979. She also obtained silver medals in the Individual World Championships in 1981 and 1985. She won the overall World Cup in 1983 (unofficial cup), and finished second in 1984 and 1988.

Volden is married to orienteer Øyvin Thon. In 2005 they both climbed Cho Oyu (8201 meters).

She represented the sports club Kongsberg IF.

References

1960 births
Living people
Norwegian orienteers
Female orienteers
Foot orienteers
World Orienteering Championships medalists
Kongsberg IF
20th-century Norwegian women
21st-century Norwegian women